Bilge Pump are an English rock band that formed in Leeds in the mid-1990s, featuring Joe O'Sullivan, Emlyn Jones and Neil Turpin.

Bilge Pump's style is post-punk with avant garde and free-jazz influences. Early on, the NME described Bilge Pump's sound as "unlistenable guff". They have since had various releases on Gringo Records, Troubleman Unlimited and Unlabel, and members have been involved with artists such as Enablers, Yann Tiersen, Polaris, Felix, Chris Corsano, HiM.

Bilge Pump recorded several John Peel Sessions, and received enough votes to be 95th on the list for ATP vs The Fans 2009. Since their inception, they have played with (among many others) Lightning Bolt, The Mars Volta, Hella, Foals and Les Savy Fav.

Discography

Albums
Let Me Breathe (2002, Gringo Records) – CD
’’Rupert The Sky’’ (2008, Gringo) - vinyl/CD
We Love You (2019, Gringo) – vinyl/CD

Singles and EPs

The Fucking Cunts Still Treat Us Like Pricks (2010, Gringo) – 10" vinyl EP

References

External links

Gringo Records page

Musical groups established in 1994
Post-punk groups from Leeds
1994 establishments in England